Delia (minor planet designation: 395 Delia) is a large Main belt asteroid. It was discovered by the French astronomer Auguste Charlois on 30 November 1894 in Nice. Delia is an alternate name for the ancient Greco-Roman Moon goddess. The orbital plane is tilted at an angle of 3.35° to the plane of the ecliptic.

This is a dark, carbonaceous body with a low albedo of 0.03 and is classified as a C-type asteroid in the Tholen taxonomy. It has an estimated cross-section of 44.2 km/s and is spinning with a rotation period of 19.7 hours.

References

External links
 
 

Background asteroids
Delia
Delia
C-type asteroids (Tholen)
Ch-type asteroids (SMASS)
18941130